"Dexterity" is a 1947 jazz composition by saxophonist Charlie Parker, which has become a jazz standard. It has since been covered by artists such as the  Art Ensemble of Chicago for the album Message to Our Folks in 1969, Roy Hargrove for Parker's Mood) and Alex Riel for the album Riel Atin').
In B-flat major, the tune is based on the changes to Gershwin's "I Got Rhythm", composed for the Broadway musical Girl Crazy in 1930. The B section to the tune includes the whole of the ensemble.

References

1947 songs
Compositions by Charlie Parker
1940s jazz standards
Jazz compositions in B-flat major